Krystofer Stanley "Krys" Kolanos (born July 27, 1981) is a Canadian former professional ice hockey centre. He played with the Phoenix Coyotes, Edmonton Oilers, Minnesota Wild, and Calgary Flames in his National Hockey League (NHL) career.

Playing career
Kolanos was selected in the first round, 19th overall, in the 2000 NHL Entry Draft by the Phoenix Coyotes from Boston College. In college, he scored the game-winning goal in overtime for Boston College in the National Championship.

Kolanos' career was mostly limited by a serious concussion after Václav Varaďa hit him from behind and knocked him unconscious in a game on January 19, 2002. Varaďa received a major penalty and game misconduct as a result of his actions.

Perhaps the most memorable moment in Kolanos' NHL career occurred during his rookie season on March 31, 2002 when, despite lingering post-concussion symptoms, he scored a penalty shot goal against all-star Patrick Roy, after which the now Hall of Famer reacted emotionally and was assessed a 10-minute misconduct and a game misconduct.

Kolanos reported to the 2007 Calgary Flames' training camp. On September 19, 2007, Kolanos was assigned to the Calgary Flames' AHL affiliate, the Quad City Flames; however he did not report to the team. He later signed with Quad City in November for the 2007-08 season.

On July 11, 2008, Kolanos signed a one-year contract with the Minnesota Wild. Kolanos was assigned to the Houston Aeros to start the 2008-09 season. Kolanos was recalled multiple times by the Wild as an injury replacement, Krys was recalled for a month in January and played in 21 games adding 6 points, before returning for the Aeros playoff run.

On July 17, 2009, Kolanos signed a one-year contract with the Philadelphia Flyers. He was then assigned to AHL affiliate, the Adirondack Phantoms, for the 2009–10 season.

On February 1, 2012, Kolanos signed a two-year, two way contract with the Calgary Flames and was subsequently called up to the NHL the same day.

Personal information
Krys Kolanos' younger brother, Mark Kolanos, is also a professional hockey player in Scotland.

Career statistics

Regular season and playoffs

International

Awards and honours

References

External links
 

1981 births
Living people
Abbotsford Heat players
Adirondack Phantoms players
Arizona Coyotes draft picks
Asiago Hockey 1935 players
Boston College Eagles men's ice hockey players
Calgary Flames players
Calgary Royals players
Canadian ice hockey centres
Edmonton Oilers players
Espoo Blues players
GKS Tychy (ice hockey) players
Grand Rapids Griffins players
Houston Aeros (1994–2013) players
KHL Medveščak Zagreb players
Ice hockey people from Calgary
Krefeld Pinguine players
Lowell Lock Monsters players
Minnesota Wild players
National Hockey League first-round draft picks
Phoenix Coyotes players
Quad City Flames players
San Antonio Rampage players
SCL Tigers players
SG Cortina players
Springfield Falcons players
Starbulls Rosenheim players
Torpedo Nizhny Novgorod players
Wilkes-Barre/Scranton Penguins players
EV Zug players
Canadian expatriate ice hockey players in Croatia
Canadian expatriate ice hockey players in Finland
Canadian expatriate ice hockey players in Germany
Canadian expatriate ice hockey players in Russia
Canadian expatriate ice hockey players in Switzerland
AHCA Division I men's ice hockey All-Americans
NCAA men's ice hockey national champions